Alfred Eugene Bonniwell (October 6, 1911 – March 8, 2002) was an American basketball player.

Basketball career
An early professional in the National Basketball League, he was also an All-American college player at Dartmouth.  Bonniwell played two seasons for the Akron Firestone Non-Skids, averaging 5.1 points per game in 39 contests.

Post-basketball life
Bonniwell served in the U.S. Army in both World War II and the Korean War, and was awarded the Bronze Star. He moved to Alexandria, Virginia in 1961, and retired from the Army in 1967 as a colonel. He then worked as an employment counselor for the Virginia Employment Commission's Falls Church office from 1968 to 1978. He married his wife Maxine (1922–2007) in 1949. They remained married until Al's death, and had two daughters, Linda and Debra, and one son, Ronald. 
In 2010, Bonniwell was posthumously inducted into the Lower Merion High School Basketball Hall of Fame, as the first alumnus of the school to play professional basketball.

References

1911 births
2002 deaths
Akron Firestone Non-Skids players
All-American college men's basketball players
American men's basketball players
Basketball players from Pennsylvania
Dartmouth Big Green men's basketball players
Forwards (basketball)
Guards (basketball)
Lower Merion High School alumni
People from Ardmore, Pennsylvania